Kemebradikumo Daniel Pondei is a Nigerian professor and the former acting managing director of Niger Delta Development Commission. He was appointed by the President of Nigeria, Muhammadu Buhari on 19 February 2020.

Early life and education
Pondei is from Bayelsa State, Nigeria. He attended Federal Government College, Port Harcourt for his secondary education. He studied medicine and surgery at University of Lagos and preceded to University of Nottingham where he got his doctorate degree in Microbiology.

Career
Pondei started his career in 2001 as a lecturer. He later served as the acting head of department of medical microbiology and parasitology and acting dean of faculty of basic medical sciences at College of Health Sciences, Niger Delta University. He served as the chairman of the Nigerian Medical Association, Bayelsa State. Later in his career, he became a professor of medical microbiology and served as the provost of College of Health Sciences, Niger Delta University.

Acting managing director of NDDC
On 19 February 2020, the President of Nigeria, Muhammadu Buhari appointed Pondei as the acting managing director of Niger Delta Development Commission to replace Joi Nunieh.

Corruption scandal 
On 20 July 2020, Pondei slumped while being questioned by a probing panel in the House of Representatives over an alleged abuse of ₦81.5bn between October 2019 to 31 May 2020.

References

Living people
People from Bayelsa State
University of Lagos alumni
Nigerian microbiologists
21st-century Nigerian medical doctors
Alumni of the University of Nottingham
Year of birth missing (living people)